The Masked Singer NZ is a New Zealand reality singing competition television show based on the Masked Singer franchise which originated from the South Korean version of the show King of Mask Singer. It premiered on Three on 9 May 2021. The show is hosted by Clinton Randell, with the current judging panel comprising James Roque, Sharyn Casey, and Anika Moa.

Season overview

Season 1

Episode 1 (9 May)

Episode 2 (10 May)

Episode 3 (16 May)

Episode 4 (17 May)

Episode 5 (23 May)

Episode 6 (24 May)

Episode 7 (30 May)

Episode 8 (31 May)

Episode 9: Semi-final (6 June)

Episode 11: Final (13 June)

Season 2

Episode 1 (24 July)

Episode 2 (31 July)

Episode 3 (7 August)

Episode 4 (14 August)

Episode 5 (21 August)

Episode 6 (28 August)

Episode 7 (4 September)

Episode 8 (11 September)

Episode 9 (18 September)

Episode 11 (2 October)

References

2021 New Zealand television series debuts
New Zealand reality television series
Three (TV channel) original programming
2020s New Zealand television series
New Zealand music television series
New Zealand game shows
New Zealand television series based on non-New Zealand television series
Non-South Korean television series based on South Korean television series
Music competitions in New Zealand
Masked Singer
English-language television shows
Television series by Warner Bros. Television Studios